David Lieberman may refer to:
David William Lieberman or Hank Moon (1888–1971), comedian and silent-film actor
David Linus Lieberman or Microchip, a fictional Marvel Comics character
David Lieberman, co-founder of education company BookRags

See also
Dave Lieberman (fl. 2000s), American chef and television host